Zablaće may refer to:

 Zablaće (Čačak), a village in Serbia
 Zablaće (Šabac), a village in Serbia